Mecynogea is a genus of orb-weaver spiders first described by Eugène Simon in 1903. The name is derived from the Greek mekyno (μηυνω), meaning "to lengthen", and "gea" (γεα), meaning "earth".

Species
 it contains nine species in the Americas:
Mecynogea apatzingan Levi, 1997 – Mexico
Mecynogea bigibba Simon, 1903 – Brazil, Uruguay
Mecynogea buique Levi, 1997 – Brazil
Mecynogea erythromela (Holmberg, 1876) – Brazil, Paraguay, Argentina, Chile
Mecynogea infelix (Soares & Camargo, 1948) – Colombia, Brazil
Mecynogea lemniscata (Walckenaer, 1841) – USA to Argentina
Mecynogea martiana (Archer, 1958) – Cuba, Hispaniola
Mecynogea ocosingo Levi, 1997 – Mexico
Mecynogea sucre Levi, 1997 – Venezuela, Brazil

References

Araneidae
Araneomorphae genera
Spiders of North America
Spiders of South America
Taxa named by Eugène Simon